Heteromeyenia is a genus of sponges belonging to the family Spongillidae.

The genus has almost cosmopolitan distribution.

Species:

Heteromeyenia baileyi 
Heteromeyenia barlettai 
Heteromeyenia cristalina 
Heteromeyenia horsti 
Heteromeyenia insignis 
Heteromeyenia latitenta 
Heteromeyenia longistylis 
Heteromeyenia repens 
Heteromeyenia stepanowii 
Heteromeyenia tentasperma 
Heteromeyenia tubisperma

References

Spongillidae
Sponge genera